Minudasht is a city in Golestan Province, Iran.

Minudasht may also refer to:
 Minudasht, Markazi
 Minudasht, Qazvin
 Minudasht County, in Golestan Province